Quiéreme Más ("Love Me More") is the title of a studio album released by Duranguense music band Patrulla 81. This album became their first number-one set on the Billboard Top Latin Albums.

Track listing
The track listing from Allmusic.

Charts

Weekly charts

Year-end charts

Sales and certifications

References

2009 albums
Patrulla 81 albums
Spanish-language albums
Disa Records albums